Audactus may refer to either:

 St Audactus (d. AD 303), the companion in martyrdom of St Felix of Thibiuca
 St Adauctus, the legendary companion in martyrdom of a different St Felix supposedly also murdered in 303